The commune of Ntega is a commune of Kirundo Province in northern Burundi. The capital lies at Ntega.

References

Communes of Burundi
Kirundo Province